John George Baby (born May 18, 1957) is a Canadian former professional ice hockey defenceman who played two seasons in the National Hockey League for the Cleveland Barons and Minnesota North Stars between 1977 and 1979.

Baby was born in Sudbury, Ontario.

Career statistics

Regular season and playoffs

External links
 

1957 births
Living people
Binghamton Dusters players
Binghamton Whalers players
Canadian ice hockey defencemen
Cleveland Barons (NHL) draft picks
Cleveland Barons (NHL) players
Ice hockey people from Ontario
Sportspeople from Greater Sudbury
Kalamazoo Wings (1974–2000) players
Kitchener Rangers players
Minnesota North Stars players
New England Whalers draft picks
Oklahoma City Stars players
Phoenix Roadrunners (CHL) players
SC Rapperswil-Jona Lakers players
Sudbury Wolves players
Syracuse Firebirds players